Lars Isak Anders From (born 1967) is a Swedish politician, trade unionist and member of the Riksdag, the national legislature. A member of the Social Democratic Party, he has represented Västerbotten County since October 2010.

From is the son of farmer/miner Helmer Frohm and programmer May Frohm (née Norberg). He was educated in Gothenburg and received vocational training (AMU) in Gällivare. He has held various skilled manual work including at Volvo and TGB Group. He has held various roles at the IF Metall trade union. He has been a member of the municipal council in Norsjö Municipality since 2002.

References

1967 births
Living people
Members of the Riksdag 2010–2014
Members of the Riksdag 2014–2018
Members of the Riksdag 2018–2022
Members of the Riksdag 2022–2026
Members of the Riksdag from the Social Democrats
People from Norsjö Municipality
Swedish trade unionists